The Bully, the Bullied, and the Bystander (full title: The Bully, the Bullied, and the Bystander: From Preschool to High School—How Parents and Teachers Can Help Break the Cycle of Violence) is a 2003 nonfiction book by Barbara Coloroso. The book covers the issue of school bullying and the roles played by those involved, including the victims and bystanders.

Synopsis
The book examines the phenomena of bullying, particularly amongst students, including taunting, tormenting, and aggressive behavior by stronger students against weaker students. It describes the key players as well as the problems and possible solutions in dealing with them. It also discusses the roles of parents, students, and teachers in such situations as well as what they can and should do.

2010 edition
A 2010 edition of the book included updated & modernized information.

References

External links
The Bully, The Bullied, and the Bystander -short essay on the subject by Barbara Coloroso (book author).
Book review at goodreads

Bullying
Psychology books